SMS S31 was a 1913 Type Large Torpedo Boat (Großes Torpedoboot ) of the Imperial German Navy. Commissioning in August 1914, she served during World War I and was sunk by a mine during the Battle of the Gulf of Riga on 19 August 1915.

Construction
In 1913, the Imperial German Navy placed orders for 12 high-seas torpedo boats, with a half-flotilla of six ordered from AG Vulcan (V25–V30) and Schichau-Werke (S31–S36). While the designs built by each shipyard were broadly similar, they differed from each other in detail, and were significantly larger and more capable than the small torpedo boats built for the German Navy in the last two years.  S31 was the first of the six torpedo-boats ordered from the Schichau-Werke.

S31 was launched at Schichau's Elbing shipyard on 20 December 1914 and commissioned on 8 August 1914.

Armament consisted of three 8.8 cm SK L/45 naval guns in single mounts, together with six 50 cm (19.7 in) torpedo tubes with two fixed single tubes forward and 2 twin mounts aft. Up to 24 mines could be carried. The ship had a complement of 83 officers and men.

Service
In October 1914 S31 was a member of the 17th Half-Flotilla and took part in operations in the Baltic sea. During August 1915 S31, as part of the 9th Torpedo Boat Flotilla, took part in the Battle of the Gulf of Riga. She struck a mine near the island of Ruhnu on 19 August, sinking with the loss of 11 men.

References

 

 

Torpedo boats of the Imperial German Navy
World War I torpedo boats of Germany
1913 ships
Ships built in Elbing
Ships built by Schichau
Maritime incidents in 1915
World War I shipwrecks in the Baltic Sea
Ships sunk by mines